The Union County Academy for Allied Health Sciences (UCAAHS) is a full-time Vocational public high school, located in Scotch Plains, in Union County, New Jersey, United States. This school serves students in ninth through twelfth grades from across Union County as a career academy on the Union County Vocational Technical Schools Campus, which also includes the Academy for Information Technology, Union County Magnet High School, Academy for Performing Arts, and the Union County Vocational Technical High School. The school has been accredited by the Middle States Association of Colleges and Schools Commission on Elementary and Secondary Schools.

The Academy is dedicated to the education of students in the field of Allied Health Sciences, as part of the Union County Vocational Technical Schools. The school was founded in September 2005.

As of the 2021–22 school year, the school had an enrollment of 309 students and 15.2 classroom teachers (on an FTE basis), for a student–teacher ratio of 20.3:1. There were 25 students (8.1% of enrollment) eligible for free lunch and 9 (2.9% of students) eligible for reduced-cost lunch.

Awards, recognition and rankings
The school was one of nine public schools—and the only public high school—recognized in 2017 as Blue Ribbon Schools by the United States Department of Education.

In its listing of "America's Best High Schools 2016", the school was ranked 21st out of 500 best high schools in the country; it was ranked eighth among all high schools in New Jersey.

The Academy for Allied Health Sciences was ranked as the 21st overall High School in the nation and 2nd ranked High School in New Jersey on the list of "America's Top Schools 2014" prepared by Newsweek magazine.  In its 2014 report on  "America's Best High Schools", The Daily Beast ranked the school 47th in the nation among participating public high schools and 6th among schools in New Jersey.  It was ranked 70th by Newsweek magazine in its 2011 list of America's Best High Schools.

As a public high school in the state of New Jersey, the Academy for Allied Health Sciences complies with state mandated High School Proficiency Assessment (HSPA) testing for its Junior students. Since inception, 100% of students at the Academy for Allied Health Sciences earn passing scores. For the Class of 2010, 49.2% of students received scores of Advanced Proficiency in the Language Arts section, while 79.7% of students received scores of Advanced Proficiency in the Mathematics section. These figures are among the highest in the state.  Schooldigger.com ranked the school as one of 16 schools tied for first out of 381 public high schools statewide in its 2011 rankings (unchanged from the 2010 rank) which were based on the combined percentage of students classified as proficient or above proficient on the language arts literacy (100.0%) and mathematics (100.0%) components of the High School Proficiency Assessment (HSPA).

Application and admission 
The Union County Academy for Allied Health Sciences is highly selective, application-only school. Applicants must be in high academic standing. As part of the application process, it is mandatory to attend an "Information Session", and then take a two part entrance exam, consisting of English and Math sections. This is the same exam taken by all applicants to a UCVTS school (includes Union County Magnet High School, Academy for Performing Arts, Academy for Information Technology, and the Union County Vocational Technical High School) . Admission is very competitive, with approximately 3-6 students selected each year from every town in Union County.

Admissions is based on a scale of 0-100 the following criteria:

 Grade point average - 7th grade
 Grade point average - 8th grade 1st marking period
 Admissions Assessment for Mathematics
 Admissions Assessment for Language Arts

The process of being accepted is as following

 Attendance at an information session
 Submissions of an application and transcripts to the admissions office
 Admissions examination - Mid January
 Notification of acceptance - On or before April 1

Curriculum 
Graduation requirements include:

Mathematics (see below) - 4 years
 Combined Algebra (1 & 2)
 Geometry/Trigonometry
 Math Analysis
 AP Calculus I/AB, AP Calculus II/BC, Multivariable Calculus, Probability and Statistics

Science - 4 years
 Biology & Scientific Inquiry and Analysis
 Chemistry & Anatomy and Physiology
 Physics, AP Biology, AP Chemistry, Food Science, Forensic Science
 Psychology, Biochemistry, Chemical Engineering, Ecology, AP Chemistry, AP Physics, AP Biology

Language Arts - 4 years
 English I- World Literature
 English II- Early American Literature
 English III- American Literature II
 English IV- British Literature or AP English

Fitness/Health - 4 years

World Language: Spanish (see below) - 3 years
 Spanish I, II, III, IV & AP Spanish

Social Studies - 3 years
 World History I
 US History I
 US History II
 AP United States Government and Politics

Visual & Performing Arts - 1 year
 Dance I (Equivalent of Half-year)
 Dance II (Equivalent of Half-year)

The Allied Health Component of UC AAHS includes:

Freshmen:
 Dynamics of Health Care in Society

Sophomores:
 Fundamentals of Health and Wellness & Community Health
 American Red Cross CPR for the Professional Rescuer
 Medical Terminology
 Emergency and Clinical Care

Juniors:
 Anatomy and Physiology I
 American Red Cross First Responder Training

Seniors:
EMT-Basic Certification from UCC
 Senior Internship

NOTE: Math and World Language courses offer placement tests before the star of freshman year, allowing rising freshmen to skip courses up to Math Analysis and Spanish III,  respectively. Students must still complete the required years of study.

State and college entrance exams
With respect to PSAT and SAT scores, students consistently receive National Merit Commendations annually, while SAT score ranges are significantly above state averages. For the Class of 2009, the following average scores were reported. 87% of students in the Class of 2009 had taken the SAT by the time the School Report Card for 2008-2009 was published.

Mathematics: 613
Critical Reading: 592
Writing: 608

Awards
The Academy for Allied Health Sciences has sent students to the HOSA (Health Occupations Students of America) National Leadership Conference. Awards include Gold and Silver medals in Creative Problem Solving and Medical Reading, along with top 10 finishes in a number of other competitions. The school has also produced three National Executive Council members, who have represented over 202,000 HOSA members internationally.

In addition, the Academy for Allied Health Sciences and Magnet High School, were named the #1 youth per capita in the nation by the American Cancer Society for their fundraising efforts at their Relay for Life event.

Students at the Academy for Allied Health Sciences have been selected for the Edward J. Bloustein Distinguished Scholar, the New Jersey Governor's School in the Sciences and the New Jersey Governor's School on the Environment, National Achievement Finalists, National Merit Commendations, and the prestigious Gates Millennium Scholarship.

References

External links 
Union County Academy for Allied Health Sciences website

Data for the Union County Academy for Allied Health Sciences, National Center for Education Statistics

2005 establishments in New Jersey
Educational institutions established in 2005
Magnet schools in New Jersey
Public high schools in Union County, New Jersey
Scotch Plains, New Jersey